Station Road, Beeston is street in Beeston, Nottinghamshire. It runs from its junction with High Road, Beeston in Beeston Square to Beeston railway station.

History

The first part of Station Road was built in conjunction with the opening of Beeston railway station in 1839. It ran north from the station to form a junction with Queen’s Road.

Queen Victoria's jester, W. F. Wallett lived in the cottage which he had built to the designs of the architect William Arthur Heazell at 220 Station Road from 1877 until his death in 1892

In 1904-05, Beeston Urban District Council undertook improvement and widening works on Brown Lane (which ran from High Road to Middle Street). Brown Lane South (which ran to the junction with Nether Street), and with Victoria Avenue (constructed in the 1890s from the junction with Nether Street to Queens Road), they were all renamed Station Street.

In 1913, Beeston Lads’ Club. was erected to the designs of the architect S.H. Pearson which survived until it was demolished in 2007. The site is now occupied by Tesco supermarket.

In 1918, Beeston Victory Club opened as a venue for ex-servicemen of the forces which fought in the First World War.

In 1965 the Fire Station moved from Stoney Street to a new prefabricated CLASP building on Station Road at the corner of Middle Street. In 1998 it came under the control of Nottinghamshire Fire and Rescue Service, and it closed in 2009.

Notable buildings

East side

Civic Restaurant. 1949. (Later a Television Repair Workshop. In 2019 Mint Hair Boutique)
139. Tower house. Architect Charles Nelson Holloway 1905
159. House. Architect Douglas Leonard Booth 1913
205-207. Houses. Architect Harry Gill 1890s (In 2019 The Linden Leaf Hotel)
209. The Rockway Hotel
211. House. Architect The LMS Engineer’s Department 1923-24

West side 
104-106. Bakehouse and oven. Architect Arthur Brewill 1888
Majestic Cinema (later Essoldo Cinema). Architect Ernest S. Roberts 1938 (demolished 1988 and now a Co-op supermarket)
222-224. Cromwell Villas. 1882
226-228. Ireton Villas. 1882
Beeston railway station

References

Streets in Beeston, Nottinghamshire